Maria Island National Park occupies the whole of Maria Island off the east coast of Tasmania, Australia, 69 km (straight-line distance) northeast of Hobart or about 90 kilometres by road to Triabunna followed by a ferry ride. The island has had a mixed history, including two convict eras, two industrial eras, a farming era and, finally, becoming the national park that it is today. Maria Island is a mecca for visitors, providing an array of interests for the daytripper or overnight visitor to the island.

History

First convict era 1825–32
Lieutenant Governor Arthur established a penal settlement at Darlington in 1825 for convicts whose crimes were not of 'so flagrant a nature' that they should be sent to the notorious Macquarie Harbour settlement on Tasmania's west coast. A small party of soldiers under the command of Lieutenant Peter Murdoch, and fifty male prisoners, arrived at the island aboard the ship Prince Leopold in March 1825. Initially housing was log and bark huts or tents. After the arrival of a new Commandant, Major Thomas Lord, in August, more permanent buildings were erected using bricks made on the island and sandstone excavated from the sea cliffs. The commissariat store (1825) and the penitentiary (1830) can still be seen today and are the only surviving buildings from this era. Industries such as cloth, blanket and shoe-making, tanning, timber cutting, and pottery were fostered. Frequent escape attempts, complaints about relaxed discipline and the opening of Port Arthur in 1830 led to the decision to abandon the settlement in 1832.

Second convict era 1842–50
The second convict era commenced in 1842. Under the probation system of the 1840s, convicts were withdrawn from private service and grouped together in government stations. Probation stations were established at Darlington and Point Lesueur (10 kilometres south-southwest of Darlington and also known as Long Point). Officials and 600 male convicts in Darlington were housed in old and altered structures re-used from the first convict era, and new buildings were also erected. Overcrowding and ill-adapted buildings were constant problems.

First industrial era 1888–96
Maria Island's potential for wine and silk production, fruit-growing and tourist developments attracted an Italian entrepreneur, Diego Bernacchi. In 1884 Bernacchi secured a long term lease of the island from the Tasmanian Government and the 'Maria Island Company' was formed. Bernacchi renamed Darlington "San Diego", and the little town soon had in excess of 250 residents of a variety of different nationalities. Bernacchi established a small cement works which made use of the island's limestone deposits. The opening of the Grand Hotel in 1888, complete with dining, billiard and accommodation rooms, saw the promotion of the island as a pleasure resort and sanatorium. Also constructed during this era were the Coffee Palace, a row of workers' cottages known as the 'Twelve Apostles' and six terraced cottages, built using bricks from the demolished convict separate apartment cells. Some of the old convict buildings were re-modelled to house workers, managers and shops. Bernacchi's family resided in the old religious instructor's house for a time. The 208-cell apartment block from the second convict era was demolished and the bricks used to build other buildings and roads.  Only two photographs exist today of this building. Although Bernacchi was enthusiastic, the Maria Island Company went into liquidation in 1892. Bernacchi promoted the island's cement industry and formed a new company for that purpose. It was short-lived, and in 1896 Bernacchi and his family left for Melbourne, and subsequently London. Afterwards, tourists continued to frequent the island where Rosa Adkins ran a boarding house in the former Coffee Palace.

Second industrial era 1925–30
Diego Bernacchi returned to Maria Island, determined to exploit the limestone deposits for cement and expand on his initial plans. The National Portland Cement Company Ltd was formed in 1920. A railway line conveyed limestone to the works. Machinery worth over £125,000 had been imported from Copenhagen and London. The works were officially opened in February 1924. Community life prospered for the 500 or so residents. Social and sports clubs sprang up, dances were held and the old chapel was used as a cinema. A school was erected for the employees' children. The schoolmaster's house of this period is now the Ranger's Office. Unfortunately, production problems were experienced at the works from an early stage, and together with the effects of the Great Depression, caused the cessation of business in 1930.

Farming era 1930–72
After the conclusion of the second industrial era, Maria Island became a quiet home to a few farming families. In particular, the Adkins, French, Howell, Robey, Hunt and Haigh families spent many years on the island.  The Adkins family in particular have a longer association with the island than any other name, with four generations of them calling the island home - commencing in the 1880s and continuing until the 1960s. A number of these families' names are cemented into the island's history by having buildings, farms or sites that still have their name. These include the Adkins' house (burnt down in recent years), French's Farm, Robey's Farm, Hunt's Cottage, Howell's Farm and Haigh's Farm (site only). Farming ended when the Tasmanian Government began purchasing properties from their owners in preparation for declaring the island a national park.

The National Park – 1972
In 1972 Maria Island was declared a national park.  From the late 1960s various species of fauna were released onto the island, including mammals and birds such as Cape Barren geese and emus (from mainland Australia). Emu numbers increased to an estimated 20-30 by the early 1980s, by which time it was decided they were a risk to visitors and efforts were made to eradicate them. The last emu is thought to have been shot during the first of the Kangaroo culls in 1994. They have not been sighted since.

The island's first ranger was Rex Gatenby. Prior to the island being declared a national park, many of the historical cement works buildings were demolished due to the danger the government thought the buildings would present to tourists. At this time such buildings were not generally considered historically significant.

Attractions for visitors

History and scenery
The historical and natural assets of Maria Island attract many tourists. As well as the industrial and convict buildings and ruins, there are natural features and many walks. Mount Maria is the island's highest peak at 711 metres and is approximately a six-hour return walk. Bishop and Clerk, a peak at the island's northern end, is about a four-hour return walk. The sandstone cliffs known as the Painted Cliffs are just south of Darlington. About 30 minutes' walk north of Darlington are the Fossil Cliffs, located in Fossil Bay and packed with fossils.

Animals
The island has been identified by BirdLife International as an Important Bird Area (IBA) because it supports significant numbers of endangered swift parrots and forty-spotted pardalotes, over 1% of the world population of Pacific gulls, as well as populations of most of Tasmania's endemic bird species.  Cape Barren geese are common on the island, as are eastern grey kangaroos, eastern bettongs and other marsupials. Common wombats can be seen almost anywhere. Tasmania's three species of snake are all found on the island: the tiger snake, lowland copperhead and white-lipped snake.

Marine features
Maria Island National Park includes a marine area which stretches from Fossil Bay on the northern coast of the island to Return Point on the west coast, and extends up to a kilometre offshore. South-west of the Painted Cliffs and just outside the marine section of the park, a disused coastal trader was sunk in 2007 to form a dive reef. There are also numerous shipwrecks around the island.

Facilities for visitors
There are no shops on the island. Regardless of whether you visit for a day or a longer stay, all equipment and supplies need to be taken with you. Darlington has both reticulated and tank water. There are also camping areas at Darlington, French's Farm, Robey's Farm and Encampment Cove. The French's Farm, Encampment Cove and Robey's Farm campsites have tank water. Rangers should be consulted about the supply of water in these tanks prior to venturing south from Darlington. In Darlington, the former penitentiary has been converted into accommodation, with each room containing bunk beds and a wood heater. There are showers at Darlington. Also at Darlington there are gas barbecues for visitors.

See also
 Protected areas of Tasmania

External links
 
Maria Island National Park – Official Parks and Wildlife Service site

References

National parks of Tasmania
East Coast Tasmania
Protected areas established in 1972
1972 establishments in Australia
Important Bird Areas of Tasmania